Jafarabad (also Romanized as Ja‘farābād) is a village in Harazpey-ye Jonubi Rural District, in the Central District of Amol County, Mazandaran Province, Iran. At the 2006 census, its population was 507, in 138 families.

References 

Populated places in Amol County